Hornby Priory was an English Premonstratensian monastic house in Hornby, Lancashire. Dedicated to St Wilfrid, the priory was a dependent cell of Croxton Abbey in Leicestershire. It was probably founded by Roger de Montbegon of Hornby, otherwise his father Adam or grandfather Roger.

In 1544 Thomas Stanley, 2nd Baron Monteagle and Henry Croft bought the site of Hornby Priory.

See also
List of monastic houses in Lancashire

References

Footnotes

Bibliography

Buildings and structures in the City of Lancaster
Demolished buildings and structures in England
Monasteries in Lancashire
Premonstratensian monasteries in England